Geminder is a surname. Notable people with the surname include:

 Bedřich Geminder (1901–1952), Czechoslovak politician
 Fiona Geminder, Australian businesswoman
 Raphael Geminder, Australian businessman